Icelia is a genus of bristle flies in the family Tachinidae. There are at least four described species in Icelia.

Species
These four species belong to the genus Icelia:
 Icelia brasiliensis Robineau-Desvoidy, 1830 c g
 Icelia flavescens Robineau-Desvoidy, 1830 c g
 Icelia guagliumii Guimaraes, 1976 c g
 Icelia triquetra (Olivier, 1812) i b
Data sources: i = ITIS, c = Catalogue of Life, g = GBIF, b = Bugguide.net

References

Further reading

External links

 

Tachininae